The Rolls-Royce Merlin is a British liquid-cooled V-12 piston aero engine of 27-litres (1,650 cu in) capacity. Rolls-Royce designed the engine and first ran it in 1933 as a private venture. Initially known as the PV-12, it was later called Merlin following the company convention of naming its four-stroke piston aero engines after birds of prey.

After several modifications, the first production variants of the PV-12 were completed in 1936. The first operational aircraft to enter service using the Merlin were the Fairey Battle, Hawker Hurricane and Supermarine Spitfire. The Merlin remains most closely associated with the Spitfire and Hurricane, although the majority of the production run was for the four-engined Avro Lancaster heavy bomber. A series of rapidly-applied developments, brought about by wartime needs, markedly improved the engine's performance and durability.

One of the most successful aircraft engines of the World War II era, some 50 versions of the Merlin were built by Rolls-Royce in Derby, Crewe and Glasgow, as well as by Ford of Britain at their Trafford Park factory, near Manchester. A de-rated version was also the basis of the Rolls-Royce/Rover Meteor tank engine. Post-war, the Merlin was largely superseded by the Rolls-Royce Griffon for military use, with most Merlin variants being designed and built for airliners and military transport aircraft.

The Packard V-1650 was a version of the Merlin built in the United States. Production ceased in 1950 after a total of almost 150,000 engines had been delivered. Merlin engines remain in Royal Air Force service today with the Battle of Britain Memorial Flight, and power many restored aircraft in private ownership worldwide.

Design and development

Origin
In the early 1930s, Rolls-Royce started planning its future aero-engine development programme and realised there was a need for an engine larger than their 21-litre (1,296 cu in) Kestrel which was being used with great success in a number of 1930s aircraft. Consequently, work was started on a new -class design known as the PV-12, with PV standing for Private Venture, 12-cylinder, as the company received no government funding for work on the project. The PV-12 was first run on 15 October 1933 and first flew in a Hawker Hart biplane (serial number K3036) on 21 February 1935. The engine was originally designed to use the evaporative cooling system then in vogue. This proved unreliable and when ethylene glycol from the U.S. became available, the engine was adapted to use a conventional liquid-cooling system. The Hart was subsequently delivered to Rolls-Royce where, as a Merlin testbed, it completed over 100 hours of flying with the Merlin C and E engines.

Fortunately, two designs had been developed: the Supermarine Spitfire and the Hawker Hurricane; the latter designed in response to another specification, F36/34. Both were designed around the PV-12 instead of the Kestrel, and were the only contemporary British fighters to have been so developed. Production contracts for both aircraft were placed in 1936, and development of the PV-12 was given top priority as well as government funding. Following the company convention of naming its piston aero engines after birds of prey, Rolls-Royce named the engine the Merlin after a small, Northern Hemisphere falcon (Falco columbarius).

Two more Rolls-Royce engines developed just prior to the war were added to the company's range. The  Rolls-Royce Peregrine was an updated, supercharged development of their V-12 Kestrel design, while the  42-litre (2,560 cu in) Rolls-Royce Vulture used four Kestrel-sized cylinder blocks fitted to a single crankcase and driving a common crankshaft, forming an X-24 layout. This was to be used in larger aircraft such as the Avro Manchester.

Although the Peregrine appeared to be a satisfactory design, it was never allowed to mature since Rolls-Royce's priority was refining the Merlin. As a result, the Peregrine saw use in only two aircraft: the Westland Whirlwind fighter and one of the Gloster F.9/37 prototypes. The Vulture was fitted to the Avro Manchester bomber, but proved unreliable in service and the planned fighter using it – the Hawker Tornado – was cancelled as a result. With the Merlin itself soon pushing into the  range, the Peregrine and Vulture were both cancelled in 1943, and by mid-1943 the Merlin was supplemented in service by the larger Griffon. The Griffon incorporated several design improvements and ultimately superseded the Merlin.

Development
Initially the new engine was plagued with problems such as failure of the accessory gear trains and coolant jackets. Several different construction methods were tried before the basic design of the Merlin was set. Early production Merlins were unreliable: Common problems were cylinder head cracking, coolant leaks, and excessive wear to the camshafts and crankshaft main bearings.

Early engines
The prototype, developmental, and early production engine types were the:
 PV-12
 The initial design using an evaporative cooling system. Two built, passed bench type testing in July 1934, generating  at  equivalent. First flown 21 February 1935.
 Merlin B
 Two built, ethylene glycol liquid cooling system introduced. "Ramp" cylinder heads (inlet valves were at a 45-degree angle to the cylinder). Passed Type Testing February 1935, generating  at  equivalent.
 Merlin C
 Development of Merlin B; crankcase and cylinder blocks became three separate castings with bolt-on cylinder heads.
 Merlin E
 Similar to C with minor design changes. Failed military 100-hour test in March 1936. Powered the Supermarine Spitfire prototype.

 Merlin F (Merlin I)
 Similar to C and E. First flight in Horsley 16 July 1936. This became the first production engine, and was designated as the Merlin I. The Merlin continued with the "ramp" head, but this was not a success and only 172 were made. The Fairey Battle I was the first production aircraft to be powered by the Merlin I and first flew on 10 March 1936.
 Merlin G (Merlin II)
 Replaced "ramp" cylinder heads with parallel pattern heads (valve stems parallel to the cylinder bore axis) scaled up from the Kestrel engine. 400-hour flight endurance tests carried out at RAE July 1937; acceptance test 22 September 1937. It was first widely delivered as the  Merlin II in 1938, and production was quickly stepped up for Fairey Battle II.
 Merlin III
Formed basis for the Rolls-Royce/Rover Meteor tank engine
 "Racing" Merlin
Racing engine for 1937/38 "Speed Spitfire" world speed record attempt. Merlin III with strengthened pistons, connecting rods, and gudgeon-pins, running on increased octane fuel, developed  at 3,200 rpm and +27 lb boost, a power/weight ratio of 0.621 lb per horsepower.
 Merlin IV
Merlin with pressure-water cooling for Armstrong Whitworth Whitley IV.
 Merlin V
Merlin for Fairey Battle V.
 Merlin VIII
 Merlin X
First of Rolls-Royce unitised "Power Plant" installation designs for this engine in 1937 and used in Handley Page Halifax I, Vickers Wellington II, and Armstrong Whitworth Whitley V and VII.
 Merlin XII
Merlin fitted with 0.477:1 reduction gear installed in some Spitfire II's with three-bladed Rotol constant-speed propeller.
 Merlin XX
Merlin X with Stanley Hooker re-designed supercharger incorporating re-designed inlet and improved guide vanes on impeller with revised blower gear ratios; 8:15:1 for low gear, 9:49:1 for high gear. New larger SU twin choke updraught carburettor. Revised Rolls-Royce unitised "Power Plant" installation design. Engine used in Bristol Beaufighter II, Boulton Paul Defiant II, Handley Page Halifax II and V, Hawker Hurricane II and IV, and Avro Lancaster I and III. First Merlin produced by Packard Motor Car Company as V-1650-1 and designated by Rolls-Royce as Merlin 28.

Production engines
The Merlin II and III series were the first main production versions of the engine. The Merlin III was the first version to incorporate a "universal" propeller shaft, allowing either de Havilland or Rotol manufactured propellers to be used.

The first major version to incorporate changes brought about through experience in operational service was the XX, which was designed to run on 100-octane fuel. This fuel allowed higher manifold pressures, which were achieved by increasing the boost from the centrifugal supercharger. The Merlin XX also utilised the two-speed superchargers designed by Rolls-Royce, resulting in increased power at higher altitudes than previous versions. Another improvement, introduced with the Merlin X, was the use of a 70%–30% water-glycol coolant mix rather than the 100% glycol of the earlier versions. This substantially improved engine life and reliability, removed the fire hazard of the flammable ethylene glycol, and reduced the oil leaks that had been a problem with the early Merlin I, II and III series.

The process of improvement continued, with later versions running on higher octane ratings, delivering more power. Fundamental design changes were also made to all key components, again increasing the engine's life and reliability. Ultimately, during tests conducted by Rolls-Royce at Derby, an RM.17.SM (the high altitude version of the Merlin 100-Series) achieved  at 36 lb boost (103"Hg) on 150-octane fuel with water injection.

With the end of the war, work on improving Merlin power output was halted and the development effort was concentrated on civil derivatives of the Merlin. Development of what became the "Transport Merlin" (TML) commenced with the Merlin 102 (the first Merlin to complete the new civil type-test requirements) and was aimed at improving reliability and service overhaul periods for airline operators using airliner and transport aircraft such as the Avro Lancastrian, Avro York (Merlin 500-series), Avro Tudor II & IV (Merlin 621), Tudor IVB & V (Merlin 623), TCA Canadair North Star (Merlin 724) and BOAC Argonaut (Merlin 724-IC). By 1951 the time between overhauls (TBO) was typically 650–800 hours depending on use. By then single-stage engines had accumulated 2,615,000 engine hours in civil operation, and two-stage engines 1,169,000.

In addition, an exhaust system to reduce noise levels to below those from ejector exhausts was devised for the North Star/Argonaut. This "cross-over" system took the exhaust flow from the inboard bank of cylinders up-and-over the engine before discharging the exhaust stream on the outboard side of the UPP nacelle. As a result, sound levels were reduced by between 5 and 8 decibels. Still-air range of the aircraft was also improved by around 4 per cent. The modified engine was designated the "TMO" and the modified exhaust system was supplied as kit that could be installed on existing engines either by the operator or by Rolls-Royce.

Engines were available with single-stage, two-speed supercharging (500-series), two-stage, two-speed supercharging (600-series), and with full intercooling, or with half intercooling/charge heating, charge heating being employed for cold area use such as in Canada. Civil Merlin engines in airline service flew 7,818,000 air miles in 1946, 17,455,000 in 1947, and 24,850,000 miles in 1948.

Basic component overview (Merlin 61)
From Jane's:
Cylinders
Twelve cylinders consisting of high-carbon steel liners set in two, two-piece cylinder blocks of cast "R.R.50" aluminium alloy having separate heads and skirts. Wet liners, ie. coolant in direct contact with external face of liners. Cylinder heads fitted with cast-iron inlet valve guides, phosphor bronze exhaust valve guides, and renewable "Silchrome" steel-alloy valve seats. Two diametrically opposed spark plugs protrude into each combustion chamber.
Pistons
Machined from "R.R.59" alloy forgings. Fully floating hollow gudgeon pins of hardened nickel-chrome steel. Three compression and one oil-control ring above the gudgeon pin, and one oil-control ring below.
Connecting rods
H-section machined nickel-steel forgings, each pair consisting of a plain and a forked rod. The forked rod carries a nickel-steel bearing block which accommodates steel-backed lead-bronze-alloy bearing shells. The "small-end" of each rod houses a floating phosphor bronze bush.
Crankshaft
One-piece, machined from a nitrogen-hardened nickel-chrome molybdenum steel forging. Statically and dynamically balanced. Seven main bearings and six throws.
Crankcase
Two aluminium-alloy castings joined together on the horizontal centreline. The upper portion bears the wheelcase, supercharger and accessories; and carries the cylinder blocks, crankshaft main bearings (split mild-steel shells lined with lead bronze alloy), and part of the housing for the airscrew reduction gear. The lower half forms an oil sump and carries the oil pumps and filters.
Wheelcase
Aluminium casting fitted to rear of crankcase. Houses drives to the camshafts, magnetos, coolant and oil pumps, supercharger, hand and electric starters, and the electric generator.
Valve gear
Two inlet and two exhaust poppet valves of "K.E.965" steel per cylinder. Both the inlet and exhaust valves have hardened "stellited" ends; while the exhaust valves also have sodium-cooled stems, and heads protected with a "Brightray" (nickel-chromium) coating. Each valve is kept closed by a pair of concentric coil-springs. A single, seven-bearing camshaft, located on the top of each cylinder head operates 24 individual steel rockers; 12 pivoting from a rocker shaft on the inner, intake side of the head to actuate the exhaust valves, the others pivoting from a shaft on the exhaust side of the head to actuate the inlet valves.

Technical improvements
Most of the Merlin's technical improvements resulted from more efficient superchargers, designed by Stanley Hooker, and the introduction of aviation fuel with increased octane ratings. Numerous detail changes were made internally and externally to the engine to withstand increased power ratings and to incorporate advances in engineering practices.

Ejector exhausts

The Merlin consumed an enormous volume of air at full power (equivalent to the volume of a single-decker bus per minute), and with the exhaust gases exiting at  it was realised that useful thrust could be gained simply by angling the gases backwards instead of venting sideways.

The first versions of the ejector exhausts featured round outlets, while subsequent versions of the system used "fishtail" style outlets which marginally increased thrust and reduced exhaust glare for night flying.

In September 1937 the Spitfire prototype, K5054, was fitted with ejector type exhausts. Later marks of the Spitfire used a variation of this exhaust system fitted with forward-facing intake ducts to distribute hot air out to the wing-mounted guns to prevent freezing and stoppages at high altitudes, replacing an earlier system that used heated air from the engine coolant radiator. The latter system had become ineffective due to improvements to the Merlin itself which allowed higher operating altitudes where air temperatures are lower. Ejector exhausts were also fitted to other Merlin-powered aircraft.

Supercharger
Central to the success of the Merlin was the supercharger. A.C. Lovesey, an engineer who was a key figure in the design of the Merlin, delivered a lecture on the development of the Merlin in 1946; in this extract he explained the importance of the supercharger:

As the Merlin evolved so too did the supercharger; the latter fitting into three broad categories:
 Single-stage, single-speed gearbox: Merlin I to III, XII, 30, 40, and 50 series (1937–1942).
 Single-stage, two-speed gearbox: experimental Merlin X (1938), production Merlin XX (1940–1945).
 Two-stage, two-speed gearbox with intercooler: mainly Merlin 60, 70, and 80 series (1942–1946).

In 1938 Stanley Hooker, an Oxford graduate in applied mathematics, explained "... I soon became very familiar with the construction of the Merlin supercharger and carburettor ... Since the supercharger was at the rear of the engine it had come in for pretty severe design treatment, and the air intake duct to the impeller looked very squashed ..." Tests conducted by Hooker showed the original intake design was inefficient, limiting the performance of the supercharger. These modifications led to the development of the single-stage Merlin XX and 45 series.

A significant advance in supercharger design was the incorporation in 1938 of a two-speed drive (designed by the French company Farman) to the impeller of the Merlin X. The later Merlin XX incorporated the two-speed drive as well as several improvements that enabled the production rate of Merlins to be increased. These figures were achieved at 2,850 rpm engine speed using +9 pounds per square inch (1.66 atm) (48") boost.

In 1940, after receiving a request in March of that year from the Ministry of Aircraft Production for a high-rated Merlin for use as an alternative engine to the turbocharged Hercules VIII used in the prototype high-altitude Vickers Wellington V bomber, Rolls-Royce started experiments on the design of a two-stage supercharger and an engine fitted with this was bench-tested in April 1941, eventually becoming the Merlin 60. The basic design used a modified Vulture supercharger for the first stage while a Merlin 46 supercharger was used for the second. A liquid-cooled intercooler on top of the supercharger casing was used to prevent the compressed air/fuel mixture from becoming too hot. Also considered was an exhaust-driven turbocharger but, although a lower fuel consumption was an advantage the added weight and the need to add extra ducting for the exhaust flow and waste-gates, meant that this option was rejected in favour of the two-stage supercharger.

The two-stage Merlin family was extended in 1943 with the Merlin 66 which had its supercharger geared for increased power ratings at low altitudes, and the Merlin 70 series that were designed to deliver increased power at high altitudes.

While the design of the two-stage supercharger forged ahead, Rolls-Royce also continued to develop the single-stage supercharger, resulting in 1942 in the development of a smaller "cropped" impeller for the Merlin 45M and 55M; both of these engines developed greater power at low altitudes. In squadron service the LF.V variant of the Spitfire fitted with these engines became known as the "clipped, clapped, and cropped Spitty" to indicate the shortened wingspan, the less-than-perfect condition of the used airframes, and the cropped supercharger impeller.

Carburettor developments

The use of carburettors was calculated to give a higher specific power output, due to the lower temperature, hence greater density, of the fuel/air mixture compared to injected systems. However, the Merlin's float controlled carburettor meant that if Spitfires or Hurricanes were to pitch nose down into a steep dive, negative g-force (g) produced temporary fuel starvation causing the engine to cut-out momentarily. By comparison, the contemporary Bf 109E, which had direct fuel injection, could "bunt" straight into a high-power dive to escape attack. RAF fighter pilots soon learned to avoid this with a "half-roll" of their aircraft before diving in pursuit. A restrictor in the fuel supply line together with a diaphragm fitted in the float chamber, jocularly nicknamed "Miss Shilling's orifice", after its inventor, went some way towards curing fuel starvation in a dive by containing fuel under negative G; however, at less than maximum power a fuel-rich mixture still resulted. Another improvement was made by moving the fuel outlet from the bottom of the S.U. carburettor to exactly halfway up the side, which allowed the fuel to flow equally well under negative or positive g.

Further improvements were introduced throughout the Merlin range: 1943 saw the introduction of a Bendix-Stromberg pressure carburettor that injected fuel at 5 pounds per square inch (34 kPa; 0.34 bar) through a nozzle directly into the supercharger, and was fitted to Merlin 66, 70, 76, 77 and 85 variants. The final development, which was fitted to the 100-series Merlins, was an S.U. injection carburettor that injected fuel into the supercharger using a fuel pump driven as a function of crankshaft speed and engine pressures.

Improved fuels

However, as early as 1938, at the 16th Paris Air Show, Rolls-Royce displayed two versions of the Merlin rated to use 100-octane fuel.

From late 1939, 100-octane fuel became available from the U.S., West Indies, Persia, and, in smaller quantities, domestically, consequently, "... in the first half of 1940 the RAF transferred all Hurricane and Spitfire squadrons to 100 octane fuel." Small modifications were made to Merlin II and III series engines, allowing an increased (emergency) boost pressure of +12 pounds per square inch (183 kPa; 1.85 atm). At this power setting these engines were able to produce  at  while running at 3,000 revolutions per minute. Increased boost could be used indefinitely as there was no mechanical time limit mechanism, but pilots were advised not to use increased boost for more than a maximum of five minutes, and it was considered a "definite overload condition on the engine"; if the pilot resorted to emergency boost he had to report this on landing, when it was noted in the engine log book, while the engineering officer was required to examine the engine and reset the throttle gate. Later versions of the Merlin ran only on 100-octane fuel, and the five-minute combat limitation was raised to +18 pounds per square inch (224 kPa; 2.3 atm).

In late 1943 trials were run of a new "100/150" grade (150-octane) fuel, recognised by its bright-green colour and "awful smell". Initial tests were conducted using  of tetraethyllead (T.E.L.) for every one imperial gallon of 100-octane fuel (or 1.43 cc/L or 0.18 U.S. fl oz/U.S. gal), but this mixture resulted in a build-up of lead in the combustion chambers, causing excessive fouling of the spark plugs. Better results were achieved by adding 2.5% mono methyl aniline (M.M.A.) to 100-octane fuel. The new fuel allowed the five-minute boost rating of the Merlin 66 to be raised to +25 pounds per square inch (272 kPa; 2.7 atm).

Starting in March 1944, the Merlin 66-powered Spitfire IXs of two Air Defence of Great Britain (ADGB) squadrons were cleared to use the new fuel for operational trials, and it was put to good use in the summer of 1944 when it enabled Spitfire L.F. Mk. IXs to intercept V-1 flying bombs coming in at low altitudes. 100/150 grade fuel was also used by Mosquito night fighters of the ADGB to intercept V-1s. In early February 1945, Spitfires of the Second Tactical Air Force (2TAF) also began using 100/150 grade fuel. This fuel was also offered to the USAAF where it was designated "PPF 44-1" and informally known as "Pep".

Production
Production of the Rolls-Royce Merlin was driven by the forethought and determination of Ernest Hives, who at times was enraged by the apparent complacency and lack of urgency encountered in his frequent correspondence with the Air Ministry, the Ministry of Aircraft Production and local authority officials. Hives was an advocate of shadow factories, and, sensing the imminent outbreak of war, pressed ahead with plans to produce the Merlin in sufficient numbers for the rapidly expanding Royal Air Force. Despite the importance of uninterrupted production, several factories were affected by industrial action. By the end of its production run in 1950, 168,176 Merlin engines had been built; over 112,000 in Britain and more than 55,000 under licence in the U.S.

Derby

The existing Rolls-Royce facilities at Osmaston, Derby were not suitable for mass engine production although the floor space had been increased by some 25% between 1935 and 1939; Hives planned to build the first two- or three hundred engines there until engineering teething troubles had been resolved. To fund this expansion, the Air Ministry had provided a total of £1,927,000 by December 1939.  Having a workforce that consisted mainly of design engineers and highly skilled men, the Derby factory carried out the majority of development work on the Merlin, with flight testing carried out at nearby RAF Hucknall. All the Merlin-engined aircraft taking part in the Battle of Britain had their engines assembled in the Derby factory. Total Merlin production at Derby was 32,377. The original factory closed in March 2008, but the company maintains a presence in Derby.

Crewe
To meet the increasing demand for Merlin engines, Rolls-Royce started building work on a new factory at Crewe in May 1938, with engines leaving the factory in 1939. The Crewe factory had convenient road and rail links to their existing facilities at Derby. Production at Crewe was originally planned to use unskilled labour and sub-contractors with which Hives felt there would be no particular difficulty, but the number of required sub-contracted parts such as crankshafts, camshafts and cylinder liners eventually fell short and the factory was expanded to manufacture these parts "in house".

Initially the local authority promised to build 1,000 new houses to accommodate the workforce by the end of 1938, but by February 1939 it had only awarded a contract for 100. Hives was incensed by this complacency and threatened to move the whole operation, but timely intervention by the Air Ministry improved the situation. In 1940 a strike took place when women replaced men on capstan lathes, the workers' union insisting this was a skilled labour job; however, the men returned to work after 10 days.

Total Merlin production at Crewe was 26,065.

The factory was used postwar for the production of Rolls-Royce and Bentley motor cars and military fighting vehicle power plants. In 1998 Volkswagen AG bought the Bentley marque and the factory. Today it is known as Bentley Crewe.

Glasgow

Hives further recommended that a factory be built near Glasgow to take advantage of the abundant local work force and the supply of steel and forgings from Scottish manufacturers. In September 1939, the Air Ministry allocated £4,500,000 for a new Shadow factory. This government-funded and -operated factory was built at Hillington starting in June 1939 with workers moving into the premises in October, one month after the outbreak of war. The factory was fully occupied by September 1940. A housing crisis also occurred at Glasgow where Hives again asked the Air Ministry to step in.

With 16,000 employees, the Glasgow factory was one of the largest industrial operations in Scotland. Unlike the Derby and Crewe plants which relied significantly on external subcontractors, it produced almost all the Merlin's components itself. Hillingdon required "a great deal of attention from Hives" from when it was producing its first complete engine; it had the highest proportion of unskilled workers in any Rolls-Royce-managed factory”. Engines began to leave the production line in November 1940, and by June 1941 monthly output had reached 200, increasing to more than 400 per month by March 1942. In total 23,675 engines were produced. Worker absenteeism became a problem after some months due to the physical and mental effects of wartime conditions such as the frequent occupation of air-raid shelters. It was agreed to cut the punishing working hours slightly to 82 hours a week, with one half-Sunday per month awarded as holiday. Record production is reported to have been 100 engines in one day.

Immediately after the war the site repaired and overhauled Merlin and Griffon engines, and continued to manufacture spare parts. Finally, following the production of the Rolls-Royce Avon turbojet and others, the factory was closed in 2005.

Manchester

The Ford Motor Company was asked to produce Merlins at Trafford Park, Stretford, near Manchester, and building work on a new factory was started in May 1940 on a  site. Built with two distinct sections to minimise potential bomb damage, it was completed in May 1941 and bombed in the same month. At first, the factory had difficulty in attracting suitable labour, and large numbers of women, youths and untrained men had to be taken on. Despite this, the first Merlin engine came off the production line one month later and it was building the engine at a rate of 200 per week by 1943, at which point the joint factories were producing 18,000 Merlins per year. In his autobiography Not much of an Engineer, Sir Stanley Hooker states: "... once the great Ford factory at Manchester started production, Merlins came out like shelling peas ...".

Some 17,316 people worked at the Trafford Park plant, including 7,260 women and two resident doctors and nurses. Merlin production started to run down in August 1945, and finally ceased on 23 March 1946.

Total Merlin production at Trafford Park was 30,428.

Packard V-1650

As the Merlin was considered to be so important to the war effort, negotiations were started to establish an alternative production line outside the UK. Rolls-Royce staff visited North American automobile manufacturers to select one to build the Merlin in the U.S. or Canada. Henry Ford rescinded an initial offer to build the engine in the U.S. in July 1940, and the Packard Motor Car Company was selected to take on the $130,000,000 Merlin order (equivalent to $ in  dollars). Agreement was reached in September 1940, and the first Packard-built engine, a Merlin XX designated the V-1650-1, ran in August 1941. Total Merlin production by Packard was 55,523.

Six development engines were also made by Continental Motors, Inc.

Variants

This is a list of representative Merlin variants, describing some of the mechanical changes made during development of the Merlin. Engines of the same power output were typically assigned different model numbers based on supercharger or propeller gear ratios, differences in cooling system or carburettors, engine block construction, or arrangement of engine controls. Power ratings quoted are usually maximum "military" power. All but the Merlin 131 and 134 engines were "right-hand tractor", i.e. the propeller rotated clockwise when viewed from the rear. In addition to the mark numbers, Merlin engines were allocated experimental numbers by the Ministry of Supply (MoS) – e.g.: RM 8SM for the Merlin 61 and some variants – while under development; these numbers are noted where possible. Merlin engines used in Spitfires, apart from the Merlin 61, used a propeller reduction ratio of .477:1. Merlins used in bombers and other fighters used a ratio of .42:1.

Data from Bridgman (Jane's) unless otherwise noted:

 Merlin II (RM 1S)
  at 3,000 rpm at  using + 6 psi boost (41 kPa gauge; or an absolute pressure of 144 kPa or 1.41 atm); used 100% glycol coolant. First production Merlin II delivered 10 August 1937. Merlin II used in the Boulton Paul Defiant, Hawker Hurricane Mk.I, Supermarine Spitfire Mk.I fighters, and Fairey Battle light bomber.

 Merlin III (RM 1S)
 Merlin III fitted with "universal" propeller shaft able to mount either de Havilland or Rotol propellers. Used in the Defiant, Hurricane Mk.I, Spitfire Mk.I fighters, and Battle light bomber. First production Merlin III delivered 1 July 1938.

 Merlin X (RM 1SM)
First production Merlin X, 5 December 1938.

 Merlin XII (RM 3S)
; fitted with Coffman engine starter; first version to use 70/30% water/glycol coolant rather than 100% glycol. Reinforced construction, able to use constant boost pressure of up to +12 psi using 100-octane fuel; Used in Spitfire Mk.II. First production Merlin XII, 2 September 1939.

 Merlin XX (RM 3SM)
First production Merlin XX, 4 July 1940.

 Merlin 32 (RM 5M)
Also Hurricane Mk.V and Spitfire P.R. Mk.XIII. First production Merlin 32, 17 June 1942.

 Merlin 45 (RM 5S)
Maximum boost pressure of +16 psi. First production Merlin 45, 13 January 1941.

 Merlin 47 (RM 6S)
Adapted with a Marshall compressor (often called a "blower") to pressurise the cockpit. First production Merlin 47, 2 December 1941.

 Merlin 50.M (RM 5S)
Permitted boost was +18 psi (125 kPa gauge; or an absolute pressure of 225 kPa or 2.2 atm) instead of +16 psi (110 kPa gauge; or an absolute pressure of 210 kPa or 2.08 atm) on a normal Merlin 50 engine. Merlin 50 series was first to use the Bendix-Stromberg "negative-g" carburettor.

 Merlin 61 (RM 8SM)
First British production variant to incorporate two-piece cylinder blocks designed by Rolls-Royce for the Packard Merlin. Reduction gear ratio .42:1, with gears for pressurisation pump. First production Merlin 61, 2 March 1942.

 Merlin 63 & 63A
Used in Spitfire F Mk.VIII and F. Mk. IX.

 Merlin 66 (RM 10SM)
  at  using +18 psi boost (124 kPa gauge; or an absolute pressure of 225 kPa or 2.2 atm); low-altitude version of Merlin 63A. Fitted with a Bendix-Stromberg anti-g carburettor; intercooler used a separate header tank. Used in Spitfire L.F. Mk.VIII and L.F. Mk.IX.

 Merlin 76/77 (RM 16SM)
Dedicated "high altitude" version used in the Westland Welkin high-altitude fighter and some later Spitfire and de Havilland Mosquito variants. The odd-numbered mark drove a blower for cockpit pressurising.

 Merlin 130/131
 ; redesigned "slimline" versions for the de Havilland Hornet. Engine design modified to decrease frontal area to a minimum and was the first Merlin series to use down-draught induction systems. Coolant pump moved from the bottom of the engine to the starboard side. Two-speed, two-stage supercharger and S.U. injection carburettor. Corliss throttle. Maximum boost was  gauge; or an absolute pressure of 270 kPa or 2.7 atm). On the Hornet the Merlin 130 was fitted in the port nacelle: the Merlin 131, fitted in the starboard nacelle, was converted to a "reverse" or left-hand tractor engine using an additional idler gear in the reduction gear casing.

 Merlin 133/134
 ; derated for use at low altitude 130/131 variants used in Sea Hornet F. Mk. 20, N.F. Mk. 21 and P.R. Mk. 22. Maximum boost was lowered to +18 psi gauge (230 kPa or 2.2 atm absolute).
 Merlin 266 (RM 10SM)
 The prefix "2" indicates engines built by Packard, otherwise as Merlin 66, optimised for low-altitude operation. Fitted to the Spitfire Mk.XVI.

 Merlin 620
"Universal Power Plant" (UPP) standardised annular radiator installation development of that used on Lancaster VI and Avro Lincoln. The Merlin 620–621 series was designed to operate in the severe climatic conditions encountered on Canadian and long-range North Atlantic air routes. Used in Avro Tudor, Avro York, and the Canadair North Star.

Applications
In chronological order, the first operational aircraft powered by the Merlin to enter service were the Fairey Battle, Hawker Hurricane, and Supermarine Spitfire. Although the engine is most closely associated with the Spitfire, the four-engined Avro Lancaster was the most numerous application, followed by the twin-engined de Havilland Mosquito.

List from Lumsden 2003

 Armstrong Whitworth Whitley
 Avro Athena
 Avro Lancaster
 Avro Lancastrian
 Avro Lincoln
 Avro Manchester III
 Avro Tudor
 Avro York
 Boulton Paul Balliol and Sea Balliol
 Boulton Paul Defiant
 Bristol Beaufighter II
 CAC CA-18 Mark 23 Mustang
 Canadair North Star
 CASA 2.111B and D
 Cierva Air Horse
 de Havilland Mosquito
 de Havilland Hornet
 Fairey Barracuda
 Fairey Battle
 Fairey Fulmar
 Fairey P.4/34
 Fiat G.59
 Handley Page Halifax
 Handley Page Halton
 Hawker Hart (Test bed)
 Hawker Henley
 Hawker Horsley (Test bed)
 Hawker Hotspur
 Hawker Hurricane and Sea Hurricane
 Hispano Aviación HA-1112
 I.Ae. 30 Ñancú
 Miles M.20
 North American Mustang Mk X
 Renard R.38
 Short Sturgeon
 Supermarine Type 322
 Supermarine Seafire
 Supermarine Spitfire
 Tsunami Racer
 Vickers F.7/41
 Vickers Wellington Mk II and Mk VI
 Vickers Windsor
 Westland Welkin

Postwar
At the end of World War II, new versions of the Merlin (the 600- and 700-series) were designed and produced for use in commercial airliners such as the Avro Tudor, military transport aircraft such as the Avro York, and the Canadair North Star which performed in both roles. These engines were basically military specification with some minor changes to suit the different operating environment.

A Spanish-built version of the Messerschmitt Bf 109 G-2, the 1954 Hispano Aviación HA-1112-M1L Buchon, was built in Hispano's factory in Seville with the Rolls-Royce Merlin 500/45 engine of  – a fitting powerplant for the last-produced version of the famous Messerschmitt fighter, as the Bf 109 V1 prototype aircraft had been powered by the Rolls-Royce Kestrel V-12 engine in 1935.

The CASA 2.111 was another Spanish-built version of a German aircraft, the Heinkel He 111, that was adapted to use the Merlin after the supply of Junkers Jumo 211F-2 engines ran out at the end of the war. A similar situation existed with the Fiat G.59 when available stocks of the Italian licence-built version of the Daimler-Benz DB 605 engine ran short.

The Australian built Avro Lincoln from A73-51 used Australian built Commonwealth Aircraft Corporation Merlin 102s.
A total of 108 CAC Merlins were built by the time production ended.

Alternative applications

A non-supercharged version of the Merlin using a larger proportion of steel and iron components was produced for use in tanks. This engine, the Rolls-Royce Meteor, in turn led to the smaller Rolls-Royce Meteorite. In 1943, further Meteor development was handed over to Rover, in exchange for Rover's gas turbine interests.

In 1938, Rolls-Royce started work on modifying some Merlins which were later to be used in British MTBs, MGBs, and RAF Air-Sea Rescue Launches. For these the superchargers were modified single-stage units and the engine was re-engineered for use in a marine environment. Some 70 engines were converted before priority was given to producing aero engines.

Experiments were carried out by the Irish Army involving replacing the Bedford engine of a Churchill tank with a Rolls-Royce Merlin engine salvaged from an Irish Air Corps Seafire aircraft. The experiment was not a success, although the reasons are not recorded.

Surviving engines
One of the most successful of the World War II era aircraft engines, the Merlin continues to be used in many restored World War II vintage aircraft all over the world. The Royal Air Force Battle of Britain Memorial Flight is a notable current operator of the Merlin. In England the Shuttleworth Collection owns and operates a Merlin-powered Hawker Sea Hurricane IB and a Supermarine Spitfire VC – Both can be seen flying at home displays throughout the summer months.

Engines on display

 
Preserved examples of the Rolls-Royce Merlin are on display at the following museums:
 Atlantic Canada Aviation Museum
 Aviation Heritage Museum (Western Australia)
 Montrose Air Station Heritage Centre
 Polish Aviation Museum, Kraków (Cracow), Poland
 Rolls-Royce Heritage Centre, Derby – several versions, including displayed superchargers, reduction gears and other components
 Royal Air Force Museum, Cosford & London
 Science Museum (London)
 Shuttleworth Collection
 Smithsonian Air and Space Museum, Washington, DC
 Wings Museum, West Sussex, England

Specifications (Merlin 61)

See also

References

Footnotes

Citations

Bibliography
 Air Ministry. A.P 1509B/J.2-W Merlin II and III Aero Engines (June 1940). London: Air Ministry, 1940.
 Air Ministry. A.P 1565B Spitfire IIA and IIB Aeroplanes: Merlin XII Engine, Pilot's Notes (July 1940). London: Air Data Publications, 1972 (reprint). .
 Air Ministry. Pilot's Notes for Spitfire Mark F.VII – Merlin 64 or 71 engine; Mark F.VIII – Merlin 63,66 or 70 engine. Air Publication 1565G & H -P.N. London, UK: Air Ministry, December 1943.
 Beckles, Gordon. Birth of a Spitfire: The Story of Beaverbook's Ministry and its First £10,000,000. London: Collins Clear-Type Press, 1941.
 Berger, Monty and Street, Brian Jeffrey. Invasion Without Tears. Toronto, Canada: Random House, 1994. .
 Bridgman, L. Jane's Fighting Aircraft of World War II. London: Crescent, 1998. 
 Fozard, John W.Sydney Camm and the Hurricane; Perspectives on the Master Fighter Designer and his Finest Achievement. Shrewsbury, UK: Airlife, 1991. .
 Green, William and Swanborough, Gordon. The Complete Book of Fighters. New York: Smithmark Publishers, 1994. .
 Gunston, Bill World Encyclopedia of Aero Engines (5th Edition). Stroud, UK: Sutton Publishing, 2006. 
 Harvey-Bailey, A. The Merlin in Perspective – The Combat Years (4th edition) Derby, England: Rolls-Royce Heritage Trust, 1995. 
 Hooker, Stanley Not Much of an Engineer London: Airlife, 1984. .
 King, H. F. "The Two R's: A Commemorative History of Rolls-Royce Aero Engines. (article and images)." Flight No. 2363, Volume 65, 7 May 1954.
 Lloyd, Ian and Pugh, Peter. Hives & the Merlin. Cambridge, England: Icon Books, 2004. 
 Lovesey, A C. "Development of the Rolls-Royce Merlin from 1939 to 1945." Aircraft Engineering and Aerospace Technology, Volume 18, Issue 7. London, MCB UP Ltd., July 1946. ISSN 0002-2667.
 Lumsden, Alec. British Piston Engines and Their Aircraft. Marlborough, Wiltshire: Airlife Publishing, 2003. .
 Martin, Karl. Irish Army Vehicles, Transport and Armour since 1922. 2002. .
 Mason, Francis K. Hawker Aircraft Since 1920 (3rd revised edition). London: Putnam, 1991. .
 Matusiak, Wojtek. Supermarine Spitfire Mk V: Mushroom Model Magazine Special, No. 6111. Redbourn, UK: Mushroom Model Publications, 2004. 
 McKinstry, Leo. Spitfire – Portrait of a Legend. London: John Murray, 2007. .
 Morgan, Eric B. and Edward Shacklady. Spitfire: The History. London: Key Publishing, 2000. .
 Nicholls, Robert. Trafford Park: the First Hundred Years. Phillimore & Co. Ltd., 1996. .
 Nijboer, Donald. No 126 Wing RCAF: Aviation Elite Units 35. Botley, UK: Osprey Publishing Limited, 2010. 
 Payton-Smith, D. J. Oil: A Study of War-time Policy and Administration. London: Her Majesty's Stationery Office, 1971.
 Price, Alfred. The Spitfire Story. London: Jane's Publishing Company, 1982. .
 Pugh, Peter. The Magic of a Name – The Rolls-Royce Story – The First 40 Years. Cambridge, England. Icon Books, 2000. .
 Robertson, Bruce. Spitfire: The Story of a Famous Fighter. Hemel Hempstead, Hertfordshire, UK: Model & Allied Publications, 1960. Third revised edition 1973. .
 Robotham, William Arthur. Silver Ghosts and Silver Dawn. London: Constable, 1970. 
 Rubbra, A.A. Rolls-Royce Piston Aero Engines: A Designer Remembers. Derby, England: Rolls-Royce Heritage Trust, 1990. .
 Simons, Graham M. Mosquito: The Original Multi-Role Combat Aircraft. Barnsley, Yorkshire UK: Pen & Sword Books, 2011. 
 Smallwood, Hugh. Spitfire in Blue. London: Osprey Aerospace, 1996. .
 Smith, G. Geoffrey. "A British Masterpiece.  (article and images)." Flight No. 1731, Volume XLI, 26 February 1942.
 Smith, G. Geoffrey. "Rolls-Royce Merlin 'Sixty-One' (article and images)." Flight No. 1773, Volume XLII, 17 December 1942.
 Tanner, John. The Spitfire V Manual (AP1565E reprint). London: Arms and Armour Press, 1981. .
 White, Graham. Allied Aircraft Piston Engines of World War II: History and Development of Frontline Aircraft Piston Engines Produced by Great Britain and the United States During World War II. Warrendale, Pennsylvania: SAE International, 1995. 
 Wilkinson, Paul H. Aircraft Engines of the World 1946 (3rd ed.). London: Sir Isaac Pitman and Sons, 1946.
 "Some Trends in engine design (article and images)." Flight No. 1563, Volume XXXIV, 8 December 1938.
 "Rolls-Royce Merlin 130 Series (article and images)." Flight No. 1935, Volume XLIX, 24 January 1946.
 "Two New Power Units (article and images)." Flight and The Aircraft Engineer No. 1961, Volume L, 25 July 1946.

Further reading
 Gunston, Bill. Development of Piston Aero Engines. Cambridge: Patrick Stephens, 2006. 
 Henshaw, Alex. Sigh for a Merlin: Testing the Spitfire. London: Crecy, 1999 (2nd revised edition). .
 Jackson, Robert. The Encyclopedia of Military Aircraft Bath, UK: Parragon Books, 2006. .
 Price, Alfred. Spitfire Mark I/II Aces 1939–41. London: Osprey Aerospace, 1996. .
 Quill, Jeffrey. "Spitfire: A Test Pilot's Story". London: John Murray, 1983; Crecy Publishing 1996 (2nd edition)

External links

 Merlin engines in Manchester – BBC
 Post-War Rolls-Royce film on manufacturing the Merlin – YouTube
 Merlin 60 series comparison drawings – Spitfireperformance.com
 Rolls-Royce Merlin 61 sectioned drawing
 "Vee-Twelve Par Excellence" a 1937 Flight article on the Merlin I and II
 "A British Masterpiece" a 1942 Flight article on the Merlin XX
 "Universal Power Plants" – 1947 Flight article on postwar Merlin installations for civilian aircraft
 Merlin engine photo gallery from BBC Radio Leicester
 Sectioned image of possible turbocharger installation – Flight International
 The Rolls-Royce Merlin – Aircraft Engines of The World

Merlin
1930s aircraft piston engines
V12 aircraft engines
Articles containing video clips